(originally ) is a plant pathogen that causes stigmatomycosis.

Description
It is cultivated on potato dextrose agar and grows as yeast-like oval or spherical budding cells either isolated or in short chains and has few hyphae which are septate at maturity. In addition to buds, the yeast produces many asci (or sporiferous sacs or sporangia) that are cylindrical to naviculate, with two to eight needle-like ascospores arranged lengthwise. Ascospores are apiculate to fusiform, with a distinct septum at or near the center and the upper cell slightly broader at the septum, and after liberation are held together in a mass by long appendages.  colonies are creamy and perfectly round. The yeast grows at 10–37 °C, with an optimum range of 30–35 °C. More asci form at 15–20 °C than 25–35 °C.

See also
 List of soybean diseases

References

External links 
 USDA ARS Fungal Database
 

Fungal plant pathogens and diseases
Saccharomycetes
Soybean diseases